The defending champion Agustín Calleri was eliminated in the first round.
Jan Hájek, the 2006 singles champion, came from the qualifying round to beat in the final Belgian player Steve Darcis by 6–2, 1–6, 6–4.

Seeds

Draw

Final four

Top half

Bottom half

External Links
Official website

UniCredit Czech Open
2009 Singles